Secret Chiefs 3 (or SC3) is an American avant-garde group led by guitarist/composer Trey Spruance (of Mr. Bungle and formerly, Faith No More). Their studio recordings and tours have featured different lineups, as the group performs a wide range of musical styles, mostly instrumental, including surf rock, Persian, neo-Pythagorean, Indian, death metal, film music, and electronic music.

The band's name is derived from the "Secret Chiefs" said to inspire and guide various esoteric and mystical groups of the previous two centuries. Spruance has expressed interest in, and drawn inspiration from, various mystical or occult systems such as Sufism, Kabbalah, Hermeticism, and alchemy.

Satellite bands
In 2007, it was announced that Secret Chiefs 3 has always been a general name for seven different bands, each representing a different aspect of Spruance's musical and philosophical interests. The seven bands are Electromagnetic Azoth, UR, Ishraqiyun, Traditionalists, Holy Vehm, FORMS, and NT Fan. Spruance has stated that the sound collages of Electromagnetic Azoth serve as the center of Secret Chiefs 3.

The albums Book of Horizons (2004) and Satellite Supersonic Vol. 1 (2010) were conceived as compilation albums featuring the satellite bands under their own names. All bands have appeared on at least one of these albums. Some satellite bands have also released records of their own. So far, five of the satellite bands have had tracks featured across a series of six 7" singles and Traditionalists and Ishraqiyun have delivered full-length albums.

Band members

Spruance formed Secret Chiefs 3 in the mid-1990s with fellow Mr. Bungle members Trevor Dunn on bass and Danny Heifetz on drums. Some of the many musicians who have since recorded or toured with SC3 include violinist Eyvind Kang, percussionist William Winant, drummer Ches Smith, bassist Shahzad Ismaily, former Mr. Bungle members Clinton "Bär" McKinnon, oud, gimbre, and bass player Shanir Ezra Blumenkranz, and drummer Kenny Grohowski. Musicians tend to float in and out of SC3, so the concept of "current" and "former" members is not entirely applicable.
Below is a list of past and present members, guests, and collaborators:

 Trey Spruance – guitars (electric guitar, bass guitar, baritone guitar, microtonal guitar, 12-string guitar, sympitar, Pythagorean guitar), keyboards (keyboard, electric piano, acoustic piano, tack piano, clavinet, organ, celesta), percussion (dumbek, shaker, tambourine, glockenspiel, daf, etc.), santur, rabab, banjo, mandolin, zither, tar, cümbüş, saz, carillon, dulcimer, autoharp, trumpet, sheng, synthesizer, sampler, programming, Foley sound effects, electroacoustic treatment, vocals
 Lucas Abela – power drill
 Dave Abramson — drums
 Laura Allen — vocals
 Anonymous 13 — viola, vocals
 Jennifer Cass — harp
 April Centrone – drums, percussion
 Matt Chamberlain — drums
 Paul Dal Porto — sitar
 Mike Dillon — vibraphone, tabla
 Rich Doucette – sarangi
 Toby Driver – bass guitar
 Trevor Dunn — bass guitar, vocals
 Phil Franklin – drums, percussion
 Lori Goldston — cello
 Kenny Grohowski – drums
 Timb Harris — violin, viola, trumpet
 Danny Heifetz — drums, percussion (riq, zil, tambourine, shaker, dumbek), trombone
 Kris Hendrickson — autoharp, vocals
 Bill Horist — prepared guitar

 Shahzad Ismaily — bass guitar, percussion (dhol, mridangam, ghatam, zil, etc.)
 Eyvind Kang – violin, viola, cello, erhu
 Fatima Khanoam – santur
 Jai Young Kim – keyboards, B3 organ
 Jessica Kinney – vocals
 Kevin Kmetz – shamisen
 Ursula Knudson – bowed saw
 Peژ Mon – drums
 John Wayne Law – bass guitar
 Matt Lebofsky – keyboards
 Joe Lester – bass guitar
 Clinton "Bär" McKinnon – saxophone, flute, keyboards, percussion
 John Merryman – drums
 Mike Patton – vocals
 KT Pierce – vocals
 Jesse Quattro – vocals
 Ryan Parrish – kaval, saxophones, concert flute
 Jason Schimmel — acoustic guitar, fuzz guitar, cümbüş mandolin, vocals
 Monica Schley – harp
 Shamou — percussion (darbuka, riq)
 Ches Smith – drums, congas
 Tim Smolens — bass guitar, upright bass, cello, contrabass, cello
 Adam Stacey – clavinet
 Hans Teuber — flute
 Gregg Turkington – vocals
 Unhuman – vocals
 William Winant — drums, percussion (frame drum, tabla, marimba, vibraphone, shaker, glockenspiel, gong, tubular bell, kanjira, timpani, cymbal, bell, zil, hammered dulcimer, etc.)

Discography
This is a list of all releases by SC3 and its satellite bands. The column "artist" states under what name the recording is released, not who is credited with the individual songs. Some releases, like the album Book of Horizons, are noteworthy in this regard, because they are released under the name Secret Chiefs 3, but the tracks they contain are each credited to a satellite band, giving the release the appearance of a compilation album.

Studio albums

Live albums

Compilations

DVDs

Singles and EPs

References

External links

 Secret Chiefs 3 at Web of Mimicry
 Secret Chiefs 3 at the Live Music Archive

American experimental musical groups
Musical groups from San Francisco
Web of Mimicry artists